Robert Hanbury may refer to:

 Robert William Hanbury (1845–1903), British Conservative politician
 Robert Culling Hanbury (1823–1867), British Liberal and Whig politician